Franchesca Diaz Floirendo (born October 2, 1992) is a Filipina actress, host and model who is best known for her roles on Philippine television as Hannah "Anaconda" Conde in the romantic drama Dolce Amore opposite Liza Soberano, as well as Gabriella "Gab" Crisostomo in Be My Lady, a noontime TV series.

Career

In early 2015, Floirendo was the winner of the I Am MEG Season 3 contest organized by Meg magazine under the One Mega Group.  Later that year, she was part of the Star Magic Angels group, a pageant for upcoming artists.  She studied in the Ateneo De Manila University where she graduated in 2014.

Filmography

References

External links

(official blog)
 
 

1992 births
Living people
Filipino television actresses
Actresses from Misamis Oriental
People from Cagayan de Oro
Star Magic
Ateneo de Manila University alumni